Nationality words link to articles with information on the nation's poetry or literature (for instance, Irish or French).

Events
 March - Jens Baggesen returns to Denmark. After ridiculing his fellow Danes in his poem, Holger the Dane and leaving the country for Germany, Baggensen proceeded to Switzerland and became a good friend of the Swiss poet Johan Kaspar Lavater and a leader in the Sturm und Drang movement.
 May 21 - Thomas Warton dies. He is succeeded as Poet Laureate of Great Britain by writer and police magistrate Henry James Pye (who has just retired as a Member of Parliament) following William Hayley's refusal of the office.

Works published

United Kingdom
 Joanna Baillie, published anonymously, Poems
 William Blake, published anonymously, The Marriage of Heaven and Hell, illuminated book with 27 relief-etched plates
 Robert Burns, "Tam o' Shanter" Scottish, written
 Thomas Edwards (Twm o'r Nant), Gardd o Gerddi, Welsh
 George Ellis, ed., Specimens of the Early English Poets
 Anne Francis, anonymously published "by a lady", then reissued this year under the author's name, Miscellaneous Poems
 Robert Merry, The Laurel of Liberty
 William Sotheby, Poems
 Ann Yearsley, Stanzas of Woe

United States
 Peter Markoe, the Reconciliation; or, The Triumph of Nature, an unproduced opera in verse
 Sarah Wentworth Morton, published under the name "Philenia, a Lady of Boston", Ouabi; or, The Virtues of Nature: An Indian Tale in Four Cantos, narrative poem portraying a love triangle between an Indian chief, his wife and an aristocrat from Europe; set to music in 1793 by Hans Graham; the poem inspired Louis James Bacon to write the play The American Indian in 1795
 Mercy Otis Warren, Poems, Dramatic and Miscellaneous, the first work printed under the author's own name; includes verse tragedies; many of the poems promote republican virtues and show women as moral authorities

Births
Death years link to the corresponding "[year] in poetry" article:
 January 1 – James Wills (died 1868), Irish writer and poet
 January 10 – Anders Abraham Grafström (died 1870), Swedish historian, priest and poet
 July 8 – Fitz-Greene Halleck (died 1867), American
 October 21 – Alphonse de Lamartine (died 1869), French writer, poet and politician

Deaths
Birth years link to the corresponding "[year] in poetry" article:
 May 21 – Thomas Warton (born 1728), English literary historian, critic and Poet Laureate of Great Britain
 July 25 – William Livingston (born 1723), English Colonial American public official, poet and writer
 August 22 – Andrew Macdonald (born 1757), Scottish clergyman, poet and playwright

See also

Poetry
 List of years in poetry

Notes

18th-century poetry
Poetry